Alen Mrzlečki (born 13 May 1974, in Bjelovar) is a Croatian football manager and retired player who last played for NK Bjelovar.

Club career
Mrzlečki started his career at Mladost 2014, then played for Hajduk and Šibenik. He spent several years abroad playing for Belgian clubs Harelbeke, Lokeren, Mechelen, and upon his return to Croatia he played again for Bjelovar, Pitomača and Vrbovec. He ended his playing career in 2011 with a game in Suhopolje.

Managerial career
Mrzlečki was dismissed as manager of hometown club Bjelovar in October 2018. In November 2021 he was relieved of his duties again by the club, this time while in charge of the club's junior team.

Personal life
Mrzlečki has been married to TV presenter Marta Šimić since 2000 and the couple have a son named Adam and live between Bjelovar and Zagreb.

References

External links
 

1974 births
Living people
Sportspeople from Bjelovar
Association football defenders
Croatian footballers
HNK Suhopolje players
HNK Hajduk Split players
HNK Šibenik players
K.R.C. Zuid-West-Vlaanderen players
K.S.C. Lokeren Oost-Vlaanderen players
K.V. Mechelen players
NK Bjelovar players
NK Vrbovec players
Croatian Football League players
Belgian Pro League players
Croatian expatriate footballers
Expatriate footballers in Belgium
Croatian expatriate sportspeople in Belgium
Croatian football managers